Fernando Zagharián (born January 13, 1977 in Argentina) is a former football striker who was born and raised in Argentina, but now has dual nationality with Armenia due to his Armenian origin.

He played for Argentinos Juniors (1998-02), FC Pyunik (2002–03), Atlético Brown (2003–04), Emelec (2004–05), Deportivo Morón (2005–06), Atlético Brown (2006-08) again and Club Atlético Talleres de Remedios de Escalada (2008–09). He ended his career at Brown at the end of the 2010-11 season.

External links
 Fernando Zagharián at BDFA.com.ar 

Living people
1977 births
Sportspeople from Buenos Aires Province
Argentine footballers
Argentinos Juniors footballers
FC Pyunik players
C.S. Emelec footballers
Talleres de Córdoba footballers
Argentine Primera División players
Deportivo Morón footballers
Talleres de Remedios de Escalada footballers
Argentine expatriate footballers
Argentine people of Armenian descent
Expatriate footballers in Ecuador
Argentine expatriate sportspeople in Ecuador
Armenian Premier League players
Association football forwards